Luverne Leslie Luymes (June 22, 1920 – June 5, 1996) was an American football and basketball coach and college athletics administrator. He served as the head football coach at St. Cloud State University from 1951 to 1955 and at North Dakota State University in 1956, compiling a career college football coaching record of 34–15. Luymes was also the head basketball coach at St. Cloud State from 1950 to 1954, tallying a mark of 50–37.

Head coaching record

Football

References

External links
 

1920 births
1996 deaths
North Dakota State Bison athletic directors
North Dakota State Bison football coaches
St. Cloud State Huskies football coaches
St. Cloud State Huskies men's basketball coaches
Sportspeople from Iowa